Iran fully vaccinated almost 50 percent of the population by November 5th 2021, and permanently halted vaccine shot import. General population were to take the Sinopharm BIBP vaccine.
From December 2021 electronic vaccine certificate were mandatory for work, mandatory service in  Iranian Armed Forces, universities, and schools.

Administrator
 National pandemic headquarters and Iranian Red Crescent Society
 Minister of health

Program vaccines
 Bharat COVAXIN
 AstraZeneca
 Sputnik V (undelivered)
 COVIran Barekat (delivery unfulfilled)
 Sinopharm BIBP

Minimum of quantity
 Pfizer
 Johnson and Johnson

Trial
 FAKHRAVAC
 Noora

Sources

External links
 https://salamat.gov.ir
 https://behdasht.gov.ir

Vaccination
Iran